Vipuakuje Muharukua is a Namibian politician who serves in the Parliament of Namibia. He was elected to Parliament on a Popular Democratic Movement ticket in 2014. At 31, he was the second youngest elected MP in Namibia since McHenry Venaani in 2002.

Early life and political career
Muharukua, an ethnic Ovahimba, was born in 1983 in Opuwo in the Kunene Region of north-western Namibia. He was elected to the parliament of Namibia during the 2014 general election, becoming the youngest member of that particular parliament at the time.

References

Living people
1983 births
Popular Democratic Movement politicians
People from Kunene Region